The 1978 Rhode Island Rams football team was an American football team that represented the University of Rhode Island in the Yankee Conference during the 1978 NCAA Division I-AA football season. In their third season under head coach Bob Griffin, the Rams compiled a 7–3 record (3–2 against conference opponents) and finished in a tie for second place in the conference.

Schedule

References

Rhode Island
Rhode Island Rams football seasons
1978 in sports in Rhode Island